Galka is a rural locality (a selo) in Verkhnedobrinskoye Rural Settlement, Kamyshinsky District, Volgograd Oblast, Russia. The population was 207 as of 2010. There are 6 streets.

Geography 
Galka is located on the Volga Upland, on the west bank of the Volgograd Reservoir, 52 km northeast of Kamyshin (the district's administrative centre) by road. Butkovka is the nearest rural locality.

References 

Rural localities in Kamyshinsky District
Kamyshinsky Uyezd